Narayanrao Uttamrao Deshmukh or N U Deshmukh is an Indian politician from Yeoda Village Taluka Daryapur District Amravati Maharashtra and a  member of the Indian National Congress,  he was elected in 1967 to the Maharashtra Legislative Assembly from the Daryapur constituency. He later became a State Minister in Vasantrao Naik's Cabinet.

References

Year of birth missing (living people)
Living people
Indian National Congress politicians from Maharashtra